Thomas Frandsen (born March 25, 1976) is a former Danish professional football (soccer) player, who played as a midfielder. He has played one game for the Denmark national football team. He was the manager of Viborg FF until 2003.

Career

Frandsen was not selected for the Denmark squad for the 2002 World Cup, despite being seriously considered.

References

External links
 Danish national team profile
 Career stats by Danmarks Radio

1976 births
Danish men's footballers
Danish Superliga players
Denmark international footballers
Denmark under-21 international footballers
FC Midtjylland players
Living people
Odense Boldklub players
Viborg FF players
People from Kalundborg
Association football midfielders
Sportspeople from Region Zealand